Brian P. Cleary, (born October 1, 1959) is an American humorist, poet, United States patent holder, inventor and author. He is the trademark holder for Fab-u-List (TM) Books (Serial number 90562144), a line of gift books for grownups. The bow-tie wearing children's author is best known for his books that explore grammar in humorous ways written for grade-school children. He is Senior Editor, Digital Content at AmericanGreetings.com where he has written digital greetings performed by Dolly Parton, Christina Aguilera, Smokey Robinson, William Shatner, Meghan Trainor and more.

Early life, education and career
Cleary was born in Lakewood, Ohio, one of nine children, and graduated from  Saint Ignatius High School, a private Roman Catholic Jesuit high school for young men in Cleveland, Ohio. He then graduated with a degree in Communications from John Carroll University in 1982, also located in Cleveland.

Since 1982, he has worked for American Greetings Corporation—one of the largest creative divisions in the world—where he is currently the Senior Editor working on product from greeting cards to songs, and electronic greetings. He also has toured more than 500 elementary schools in the U.S. and Europe as an author visiting schools and presenting to students and staff.

Writing
Cleary created the best-selling "Words are CATegorical" series for grade school readers, a 27-volume set with more than 3 million copies in print published by Lerner Publishing Group. Kirkus Reviews praised his book on Adjectives, as, "Neat, clever, commnendable, and groovy." " He has also written humor essays for national and local magazines and newspapers. His cartoon writings have been published in more than 600 newspapers worldwide. His books have sold more than 3 million copies worldwide. His poetry has been anthologized alongside Jack Prelutsky, Kenn Nesbitt, and Lemony Snicket in a collection tilted "One Minute Till Bedtime," published by Little, Brown Books, 2016.

Cleary's literary influences include Ogden Nash, Shel Silverstein, and E.E. Cummings.

Awards
International Reading Association/Children's Book Council Children's Choice Award
American Booksellers Association Kids' Pick of the List
Benjamin Franklin Award (First Place)
Society of School Librarians International Book Awards, Honor Book

Bibliography
All of Cleary's children's books have been published by Lerner Publishing Group and are written for grades K-6.

"Words are CATegorical" Series
Cleary's best-selling "Words are CATegorical" series include 27 titles, published from 1999 to 2015.

"Sounds Like Reading" Series
An 8-book series written for 1st graders and "English as second language" students, published in 2009.
 The Bug in the Jug Wants a Hug
 Stop, Drop, and Flop in the Slop
 The Nice Mice in the Rice
 The Frail Snail on the Trail
 The Thing on the Wing Can Sing
 Whose Shoes Would You Choose?
 The Peaches on the Beaches
 The Clown in the Gown Drives the Car with the Star

"Math is CATegorical" Series
A 7-book series that introduces math concepts to 3rd graders.
 The Action of Subtraction
 The Mission of Addition
 How Long or How Wide? A Measuring Guide
 On the Scale, A Weighty Tale
 Windows, Rings, and Grapes: A Look at Different Shapes
 A Fraction's Goal: Parts of a Whole
 A-B-A-B-A: A Book of Pattern Play

Work Appearing in Poetry Anthology
 One Minute Till Bedtime (Little, Brown 2016)

Other Lerner Book Titles
 Eight Wild Nights: A Family Hanukkah Tale (Carolrhoda Picture Books series)
 Peanut Butter and Jellyfishes: A Very Silly Alphabet Book (Millbrook Picture Books series)
 "Mrs. Riley Bought Five Itchy Aardvarks" and Other Painless Tricks for Memorizing Science Facts (Adventures in Memory series)
 Rainbow Soup: Adventures in Poetry
 The Laugh Stand: Adventures in Humor
 Rhyme & PUNishment: Adventures in Wordplay
 The Punctuation Station
 Six Sheep Sip Thick Shakes: And Other Tricky Tongue Twisters
 The Sun Played Hide-and-Seek; A Personification Story

Books for Adults
 You Oughta Know by Now (Perseus 2010)
 100 Things Worse Than Divorce; A Fun Reminder That Things Aren't as Bad as They Could Be (Fab-u-List Series 2021)
 100 Ways Your Life Could Actually be Worse; A Fun Reminder That Things Aren't as Bad as They Could Be (Fab-u-List Series 2021)
 100 Things You Should Know by the Time You're 40; Funny, Quirky, Pithy Bits of Wit and Wisdom (Fab-u-List Series 2021)
 100 Things You Should Know by the Time You're 50; Funny, Quirky, Pithy Bits of Wit and Wisdom (Fab-u-List Series 2021)
 100 Things You Should Know by the Time You're 60; Funny, Quirky, Pithy Bits of Wit and Wisdom (Fab-u-List Series 2022)
 100 Signs You Might be Irish; Observations, Wit & Wisdom About the Ways of the Irish (Fab-u-List Series 2021)
 100 Reasons Cats Are Better Than People: Scientifically Questionable Examples of Feline Superiority Over Humans (Fab-u-List Series 2022)
 100 Reasons to Hang in There: A LightHearted, Encouraging Look at What Makes Life Worth Living (Fab-u-List Series 2022)

References

External links

The World of Brian P. Cleary
Lerner Publishing Group official site

People from Lakewood, Ohio
Writers from Cleveland
American children's writers
Living people
1959 births
John Carroll University alumni
American humorists
American male poets
Saint Ignatius High School (Cleveland) alumni